Max is a given name. In the masculine, it is often short for Maximilian, Maxim, Maxwell or Maximus in English; Maximos in Greek; or Maxime or Maxence in French. In the feminine it usually stands for Maxine. On either side the name Max is popular: in the United States it has been a constant presence on popularity charts since the government began tracking naming trends in 1880. Almost all Max names derive from the Latin Maximus, in circulation since the Classical Era and used in Ancient Rome as a cognomen. This was the third name in the three-part system known as the tria nomina. The cognomen began as a nickname and would have been given to men of the patrician class who demonstrated traits of greatness. The name Maximus was introduced to the Celtic Britons during the 1st century Roman occupation. Maximus the Confessor was a 7th-century monk and theologian from Constantinople. Μost of the Max names celebrate their name day on 21 January according to the Greek Orthodox Church.

People
Max Abmas (born 2001), American basketball player
Max Adler (disambiguation), multiple people
Max Baer (boxer) (1909–1959), American world heavyweight boxing champion
Max Baer Jr. (born 1937), American, son of the boxer, actor on TV's The Beverly Hillbillies
Max Baer (judge) (born 1947), Pennsylvania Supreme Court justice
Baron Max Wladimir von Beck (1854–1943), Austrian politician
Max Beckmann (1884-1950), German artist
Max Bill (1908-1994), Swiss architect, artist, painter, industrial designer and graphic designer.
Max Birbraer (born 1980), Kazakhstan-born Israeli professional ice hockey forward
Max Blumenthal (born 1977), American journalist
Max Borghi (born 2000), American football player
Max Born (1882–1970), German physicist, mathematician and Nobel laureate
Max Brown (disambiguation), multiple people
Max Bruch (1838-1920), German composer and conductor
Max Burkholder (born 1997), American child actor
Max Cleland (1942-2021), Secretary of State of Georgia and Vietnam veteran
Max Colby (born 1980), American artist
Max Collins (disambiguation), multiple people
Max Cooper (electronica musician), European electronica and techno musician
Max Dale Cooper (born 1933), American immunologist
Max Delbrück (1906–1981), German–American biophysicist
Max Delbrück (chemist) (1850–1919), German agricultural chemist, uncle of the above
Max Domi (born 1995), Canadian ice hockey forward in the National Hockey League
Max Duggan (born 2001), American football player
Max Ernst (1891–1976) German painter, sculptor, graphic artist and poet
Max Evans (disambiguation), multiple people
Max Fleischer (1883–1972), Polish-American animator and film producer
Max Fried (born 1994), American baseball pitcher for the Atlanta Braves
Max Jakob Friedländer (1867–1958), German curator and art historian
Marty Friedman (basketball) (1889–1986), Hall of Fame NBA pro basketball player and coach
Max Gandrup (born 1967), Danish badminton player
Max Geldray (1916–2004), Dutch-born British harmonica player
Max Geller (disambiguation), multiple people
Max Giesinger (born 1988), German singer-songwriter 
Max Green (musician) (born 1984), American musician
Max Green (lawyer) (1952–1998), Australian lawyer, embezzler and murder victim
Max Harris (composer) (1918–2004), British film and television composer/arranger
Max Hastings (born 1945), British journalist, editor, historian and author
Max Hecker (born 1879), Austrian-born Israeli President of the Technion – Israel Institute of Technology
Max Heidegger (born 1997), American-Israeli basketball player in the Israeli Basketball Premier League
Max Homa (born 1990), American golfer
Max Huber (Canadian football) (born 1945), American football player in the Canadian Football League
Max Huber (graphic designer) (1919–1992), Swiss graphic designer
Max Huber (statesman) (1874–1960), Swiss lawyer and diplomat
Max Hussarek von Heinlein (1865–1935), Austrian politician, Prime Minister of Austria in 1918
Max Jammer (1915–2010), Israeli physicist and Rector and Acting President of Bar-Ilan University
Max Johnson (born 2001), American football player
Max Karoubi (born 1938), French mathematician 
Max Kelly (1930–2007), Australian mathematician
Max Kelly (footballer) (1909–1987), Australian rules footballer
Max King (disambiguation), multiple people
Max Koegel (1895–1946), German Nazi commander of several concentration camps
Max Kouguère (born 1987), Central African basketball player
Max Labovitch (1924–2018), Canadian National Hockey League player
Max Landa (1873–1933), Russian-born Austrian actor
Max Marcuse (1877–1963), Jewish-German/Israeli dermatologist and sexologist
Max Margulis (1907–1996), American writer, voice coach, and left-wing activist
Max Friedrich Meyer (1873–1967), German-born American psychologist
Max Mathiasin (born 1956), French politician
Max Meyer (footballer) (born 1995), German footballer 
Max Meyer-Olbersleben (1850–1927), German composer and pianist
Max Mitchell (born 1999), American football player
Maxey Dell Moody (1883–1949), American businessman
Max Morinière (born 1964), French retired sprinter
Max Muncy (born 1990), American Major League Baseball player
Max Müller (disambiguation), multiple people
Max Pauly (1907–1946), German SS concentration camp commandant executed for war crimes
Max Planck (1858–1947), German theoretical physicist and Nobel laureate
Max Purcell (born 1998), Australian tennis player
Max Reger (1873-1916), German composer, pianist, organist, conductor, and academic teacher
Max Reinhardt (1873–1943), Austrian-born American theatre and film director, intendant and theatrical producer 
Max Reinhardt (publisher) (1915–2002), British publisher
Max Reis (1927–2014), chemical engineer and President of the Technion – Israel Institute of Technology
Max Rheinstein (1899–1977), German-American jurist
Max Roach (1924–2007), American jazz drummer
Max Rose (born 1986), American soldier and politician
Max Rudolf (conductor) (1902—1995), German conductor
Max Saalmüller (1832–1890), Prussian lieutenant colonel and German entomologist
Max Schäfer (1907–1990), German football player and manager
Max Schäfer (soldier) (1907–1987), German World War II officer
Max Scharping (born 1996), American National Football League player
Max Scheler (1874-1928), German philosopher 
Max Scherzer (born 1984), American baseball pitcher for the New York Mets
Max Scheuer, Austrian 1920s footballer
Max Schmeling (1905–2005), German boxer 
Max Schneider (born 1992), American pop singer-songwriter
Max Sefrin (1913–2000), East German politician
Max Seibald (born 1987), American former lacrosse player
Max Seydewitz (1892–1987), German politician 
Max Steiner (1888–1971), Austrian-American composer and conductor
Max Stirner (1806–1856), German philosopher
Max Streibl (1932–1998), German politician 
Max Ugrai (born 1995), German basketball player
Max van Rysselberghe (1878–1961), Belgian engineer and Antarctic explorer
Max Verstappen (born 1997), Belgian-Dutch racing driver
Max Weber (1864–1920), German political economist and sociologist
Max Wise (born 1975), American former FBI agent, serving as a member of the Kentucky Senate
Max Wyndham, 2nd Baron Egremont (born 1948), generally known as Max Egremont, British biographer and novelist
Max Zaslofsky (1925–1985), American National Basketball Association player and American Basketball Association coach

Fictional characters 
 Max, a character in 1993 action/martial arts film Showdown
Max, in the Fox TV series 24
 Max, in the Advance Wars video games
 Max, from the 2005 film The Adventures of Sharkboy and Lavagirl in 3-D
 Max, in the Bomberman series of computer and video games
 Max, a Camp Campbell camper and a protagonist in the animated TV series Camp Camp
 Max, Darla Dimple's assistant in the 1997 animated film Cats Don't Dance
 Max, in the PBS animated TV series Dragon Tales
 Max, in the Swedish Den Max children's books
 Max, the robotic spaceship in the 1986 sci-fi adventure film Flight of the Navigator
 Max, in the 1980s TV series Hart to Hart
 Max, the Grinch's dog from the Dr. Seuss book How the Grinch Stole Christmas! and its adaptations in other media
 Max the Minifigure, the mascot of the Lego Club Magazine and The Lego Group
Uncle Max, a meerkat character in the 2004 animated film The Lion King 1½
Max, an alien character featured in Marvel Comics
 Max, an anthropomorphic rabbit character in the Nick Jr. animated preschool TV series Max & Ruby
 Max, in the animated series Mighty Max
 Max, from the 1979 film The Muppet Movie
 Max, a main character in the film Once Upon A Time In America
Max, a character in the Pokémon anime series
 Max, a character from Brawl Stars
 Max, in the Sam & Max franchise
 Max, in the 2016 3D computer-animated film The Secret Life of Pets
 Max, the boy in Christopher Nolan's Tenet
Max, a dump truck in the British animated children's TV series Thomas & Friends
 Max, in the Canadian animated TV series Total Drama: Pahkitew Island
 Max, the boy from the Maurice Sendak book Where the Wild Things Are and its adaptations in other media
 Max, in the 1968 animated musical film Yellow Submarine
 Max, the namesake owner and waiter of The Max from Saved by the Bell
 Max Black, from the CBS sitcom 2 Broke Girls
 Max Blum, from the TV sitcom Happy Endings
Max Branning, in the BBC TV series EastEnders
 Max Brass, a heavyweight champion from Arms
 Max Cady, the villain in both film versions of Cape Fear (1962 film) and Cape Fear (1991 film)
 Max Carr, a character in the 1995 family-comedy film Born to Be Wild
Max Caulfield, the main character in the 2015 video game Life Is Strange
 Max Cherry, a bail bondsman from the film Jackie Brown, which is based on the novel Rum Punch
 Max Cooper, on the television series Power Rangers Wild Force.
 Max Demian, in Hermann Hesse novel Demian
 Max Dennison, in the 1993 film Hocus Pocus
 Max Dillon, fictional Marvel Comics supervillain otherwise known as Electro. One of Spider-Man's nemeses
 Max Einstein, the main character of the book Max Einstein: The Genius Experiment by James Patterson and Chris Grabenstein
 Max Estrella, the main character of Bohemian Lights, play written by Ramón del Valle-Inclán and published in 1924.
 Max Fischer, main character in Rushmore
 Max Frost, the lead character in the film Wild in the Streets
Max Goof, the son of the Disney character Goofy
Max Guevara, the lead character in the TV series Dark Angel
Max Headroom, a 1980s TV character
Max King, in the TV series Emmerdale
Max Klinger, in the 1970s TV series M*A*S*H
Maxine "Max" Mayfield, a character in the Netflix TV series Stranger Things
Max Mercer, the main character from the Christmas movie Home Sweet Home Alone
 Max Modell, fictional Marvel Comics character. 
Max Payne, the main character in the video game series Max Payne and its film adaptation
Max Rebo, a Star Wars character
Max Ride, the main character of the Maximum Ride book series by James Patterson
Max Rockatansky, the main character in the Mad Max films
Max Russo, in the Disney Channel TV series Wizards of Waverly Place
Max Smart, in the 1995 version of the TV series Get Smart
Max Steel (a.k.a. Max McGrath in some media), from the Max Steel franchise
Max Tate (Max Mizuhara in Japanese version), from the anime/manga series Beyblade
Max Tennyson, the grandfather of Ben and Gwen Tennyson from the Ben 10 franchise
Max Thunderman, from the Nickelodeon TV series The Thundermans
 Max Tyler, in the MTV animated TV sitcom Daria
 Max von Mayerling, Norma Desmond's butler in the film Sunset Boulevard
 Max Young, in the animated TV series Fantastic Max
Max Zorin, the main antagonist in the James Bond film A View to a Kill
Max, the head vampire from the film The Lost Boys

References 

Lists of people by given name
Masculine given names
Hypocorisms
English masculine given names